Louis Pierre Vieillot (10 May 1748, Yvetot – 24 August 1830, Sotteville-lès-Rouen) was a French ornithologist.

Vieillot is the author of the first scientific descriptions and Linnaean names of a number of birds, including species he collected himself in the West Indies and North America and South American species discovered but not formally named by Félix de Azara and his translator Sonnini de Manoncourt. He was among the first ornithologists to study changes in plumage and one of the first to study live birds. At least 77 of the genera erected by Vieillot are still in use.

Biography
Vieillot was born in Yvetot. He represented his family's business interests in Saint-Domingue (Haiti) on Hispaniola, but fled to the United States during the Haitian rebellions that followed the French Revolution. On Buffon's advice, he collected material for the Histoire naturelle des oiseaux de l'Amérique Septentrionale, the first two volumes of which were published in France beginning in 1807.

Vieillot returned to France for the last time in 1798, where the position created for him at the Bulletin des Lois left him sufficient leisure to continue his natural history studies. Following the death of Jean Baptiste Audebert, Vieillot saw the two parts of the "Oiseaux dorés" through to completion in 1802; his own Histoire naturelle des plus beaux oiseaux chanteurs de la zone torride appeared in 1806.

Vieillot's Analyse d'une nouvelle Ornithologie Elémentaire (1816) set out a new system of ornithological classification, which he applied with slight modifications in his contributions to the Nouveau Dictionnaire d'Histoire Naturelle (1816–19). In 1820, Vieillot undertook the continuation of the Tableau encyclopédique et méthodique, commenced by Pierre Joseph Bonnaterre in 1790. He also published an Ornithologie française (1823–30).

Vieillot was granted a government pension in the final year of his life, but died relatively unknown and in poverty.

Vieillot is commemorated in the binomials of a number of birds, such as Lybius vieilloti (Vieillot's barbet) and Saurothera vieilloti (the Puerto Rican lizard-cuckoo).

Some believe that Leach's Storm-petrel should be named Vieillot's Storm-petrel since he was the first to obtain a specimen of the species and to describe it. He did this in the New Dictionary of Natural History, published in 1817. He described the type location as the shores of Picardy, "se tient sur l"Ocean."

Works
 Histoire naturelle des plus beaux oiseaux chanteurs de la zone torride. Dufour, Paris 1805.
 Histoire naturelle des oiseaux de l'Amérique septentrionale. Desray, Paris 1807–1808.
 Analyse d'une nouvelle ornithologie élémentaire. d'Éterville, Paris 1816.
 Mémoire pour servir à l'histoire des oiseaux d'Europe. Turin 1816.
 Ornithologie. Lanoe, Paris 1818.
 Faune française ou Histoire naturelle, générale et particulière des animaux qui se trouvent en France. Le Vrault & Rapet, Paris, Strasbourg, Bruxelles, 1820–1830.
 La galerie des oiseaux du cabinet d'histoire naturelle du jardin du roi. Aillard & Constant-Chantpie, Paris 1822–1825.
 Ornithologie française ou Histoire naturelle, générale et particulière des oiseaux de France. Pelicier, Paris 1830.

References

Further reading
"Louis Jean Pierre Vieillot," in Tom Taylor and Michael Taylor, Aves: A Survey of the Literature of Neotropical Ornithology, Baton Rouge: Louisiana State University Libraries, 2011.

External links
Gallica.fr:  All image plates for La galerie des oiseaux — the French word for 'Search' is Recherche.

French ornithologists
French taxonomists
French zoologists
1748 births
1830 deaths
18th-century French zoologists
19th-century French zoologists